In mathematics, a J-structure is an algebraic structure over a field related to a Jordan algebra. There is a classification of simple structures deriving from the classification of semisimple algebraic groups. Over fields of characteristic not equal to 2, the theory of J-structures is essentially the same as that of Jordan algebras.

Definition
Let V be a finite-dimensional vector space over a field K and j a rational map from V to itself, expressible in the form n/N with n a polynomial map from V to itself and N a polynomial in K[V].  Let H be the subset of GL(V) × GL(V) containing the pairs (g,h) such that g∘j = j∘h: it is a closed subgroup of the product and the projection onto the first factor, the set of g which occur, is the structure group of j, denoted G'''(j).

A J-structure is a triple (V,j,e) where V is a vector space over K, j is a birational map from V to itself and e is a non-zero element of V satisfying the following conditions.
 j is a homogeneous birational involution of degree −1
 j is regular at e and j(e) = e if j is regular at x, e + x and e + j(x) then

 the orbit G e of e under the structure group G = G(j) is a Zariski open subset of V.

The norm associated to a J-structure (V,j,e) is the numerator N of j, normalised so that N(e) = 1.  The degree of the J-structure is the degree of N as a homogeneous polynomial map.

The quadratic map of the structure is a map P from V to End(V) defined in terms of the differential dj at an invertible x.  We put

The quadratic map turns out to be a quadratic polynomial map on V.

The subgroup of the structure group G generated by the invertible quadratic maps is the inner structure group of the J-structure.  It is a closed connected normal subgroup.

J-structures from quadratic forms
Let K have characteristic not equal to 2. Let Q be a quadratic form on the vector space V over K with associated bilinear form Q(x,y) = Q(x+y) − Q(x) − Q(y) and distinguished element e such that Q(e,.) is not trivial.  We define a reflection map x* by

and an inversion map j by

Then (V,j,e) is a J-structure.

Example
Let Q be the usual sum of squares quadratic function on Kr for fixed integer r, equipped with the standard basis e1,...,er.  Then (Kr, Q, er) is a J-structure of degree 2.  It is denoted O2.

Link with Jordan algebras
In characteristic not equal to 2, which we assume in this section, the theory of J-structures is essentially the same as that of Jordan algebras.

Let A be a finite-dimensional commutative non-associative algebra over K with identity e.   Let L(x) denote multiplication on the left by x.  There is a unique birational map i on A such that i(x).x = e if i is regular on x: it is homogeneous of degree −1 and an involution with i(e) = e.  It may be defined by i(x) = L(x)−1.e.  We call i the inversion on A.

A Jordan algebra is defined by the identityOkubo (2005) p.13

An alternative characterisation is that for all invertible x we have

If A is a Jordan algebra, then (A,i,e) is a J-structure.  If (V,j,e) is a J-structure, then there exists a unique Jordan algebra structure on V with identity e with inversion j.

Link with quadratic Jordan algebras
In general characteristic, which we assume in this section, J-structures are related to quadratic Jordan algebras.  We take a quadratic Jordan algebra to be a finite dimensional vector space V with a quadratic map Q from V to End(V) and a distinguished element e.  We let Q also denote the bilinear map Q(x,y) = Q(x+y) − Q(x) − Q(y).  The properties of a quadratic Jordan algebra will beMcCrimmon (2004) p.83
 Q(e) = idV, Q(x,e)y = Q(x,y)e Q(Q(x)y) = Q(x)Q(y)Q(x)
 Q(x)Q(y,z)x = Q(Q(x)y,x)zWe call Q(x)e the square of x.  If the squaring is dominant (has Zariski dense image) then the algebra is termed separable.

There is a unique birational involution i such that Q(x)i x = x if Q is regular at x.  As before, i is the inversion, definable by i(x) = Q(x)−1 x.

If (V,j,e) is a J-structure, with quadratic map Q then (V,Q,e) is a quadratic Jordan algebra.  In the opposite direction, if (V,Q,e) is a separable quadratic Jordan algebra with inversion i, then (V,i,e) is a J-structure.

H-structure
McCrimmon proposed a notion of H-structure by dropping the density axiom and strengthening the third (a form of Hua's identity) to hold in all isotopes.  The resulting structure is categorically equivalent to a quadratic Jordan algebra.McCrimmon (1978)

Peirce decomposition
A J-structure has a Peirce decomposition into subspaces determined by idempotent elements.  Let a be an idempotent of the J-structure (V,j,e), that is, a2 = a.  Let Q be the quadratic map.  Define

This is invertible for non-zero t,u in K and so φ defines a morphism from the algebraic torus GL1 × GL1 to the inner structure group G1.  There are subspaces

and these form a direct sum decomposition of V.  This is the Peirce decomposition for the idempotent a.

Generalisations
If we drop the condition on the distinguished element e'', we obtain "J-structures without identity".  These are related to isotopes of Jordan algebras.

References

 
 
 
 
 
 

Algebraic structures